Beyond Our Differences is a 2008 documentary film.

A production of New York documentary film company Entropy Films, Beyond Our Differences has been featured at film festivals including the Non-Violence International Film Festival, Global Peace Film Festival, West Hollywood International Film Festival, and many others. Entropy Films sold the 74 minute film to PBS and PBS International in late 2008 for worldwide distribution.

The film features interviews with the Dalai Lama, Archbishop Desmond Tutu, Professor Robert Thurman, Congressman Brian Baird, Former President of Iran Mohammad Khatami, Peter Gabriel, Paulo Coelho, Karen Armstrong, Ela Gandhi, Klaus Schwab, Sadhguru Jaggi Vasudev, Ambassador Andrew Young, Marianne Williamson, and many other politicians, kings, queens, heads of state, and social activists.

Beyond Our Differences was produced by Peter Bisanz, Tonko Soljan, Vladimir Trushchenkov and Catherine Tatge. It aired December 26, 2008 on the Bill Moyers Journal on PBS

Awards
Winner, Golden Eagle, CINE Golden Eagle, 2008
Winner, Silver Remi, Worldfest Houston, 2008
Winner, Best Spiritual Documentary, New York International Independent Film Festival, 2008
Winner, Accolade Award, 2009
Official Selection, Peace on Earth Film Festival, 2008
Official Selection, Non-Violence International Film Festival, 2008
Official Selection, Sun Valley Spiritual Film Festival, 2008
Official Selection, Global Peace Film Festival, 2008
Official Selection, Indianapolis International Film Festival, 2009
Official Selection, West Hollywood International Film Festival, 2009
Official Selection, DocuWest, 2009
Official Selection, Atlanta International Documentary Film Festival, 2009

External links
http://www.beyondourdifferences.com/ homepage

2008 films
2008 documentary films
American documentary films
Desmond Tutu
14th Dalai Lama
2000s English-language films
2000s American films
Films scored by Anton Sanko